Matilde Vitillo (8 March 2001) is an Italian female cyclist currently riding for UCI Women's Team .

Career
In 2019 as part of the Italian nation team she won the Team pursuit at the UCI Junior Track Cycling World Championships with Giorgia Catarzi, Camilla Alessio, Eleonora Gasparrini and  Sofia Collinelli.
In 2022 she won the second stage of the Vuelta a Burgos Feminas in a photo-finish.

Major results
Sources:
2019
 1st  Team pursuit, UCI Junior Track World Championships
2022
 1st Stage 2 Vuelta a Burgos Feminas

References

External links

2001 births
Living people
Italian female cyclists
Cyclists from Turin